Saint-Jean-sur-Mayenne (literally Saint-Jean on Mayenne) is a commune in the Mayenne department in north-western France.

See also
Communes of the Mayenne department

References

Saintjeansurmayenne